Molla Deh (also Romanized as Mollā Deh) is a village in Poshtkuh Rural District, Shahmirzad District, Mehdishahr County, Semnan Province, Iran. At the 2006 census, its population was 59, in 24 families.

References 

Populated places in Mehdishahr County